Paul John Weatherwax (July 8, 1900 – September 13, 1960) was an American film editor, and two-time winner of the Academy Award for Best Film Editing.

Biography
Weatherwax was born in Sturgis, Michigan, began his editing career in silent films in 1928, and over his career edited about 85 films. His final credit, 1961's A Raisin in the Sun, was selected for preservation in the United States of America National Film Registry by the Library of Congress as being "culturally, historically, or aesthetically significant" in 2005.

He also assisted, although uncredited, on the direction of Star Spangled Rhythm in 1945 and Vendetta in 1950.

Partial filmography 
Weatherwax's films include:

 Oh, Kay! (1928)
 Rough Romance  (1930)
 Lady Godiva of Coventry (1930)
 Body and Soul (1931)
 Surrender (1931)
 While Paris Sleeps (1932)
 Long Lost Father (1934)
 The World Moves On (1934)
 True Confession (1937)
 You And Me (1938)
 Rulers of the Sea (1939)
 The Howards of Virginia (1940)
 Birth of the Blues (1941)
 The Forest Rangers (1942)
 The Fleet's In (1942)
 Let's Face It (1943)
 Star Spangled Rhythm (1945)
 Fun on a Weekend (1947)
 The Saxon Charm (1948)
 The Naked City (1948) - Academy Award for Best Film Editing
 Vendetta (1950)
 Behave Yourself! (1951)
 It Came from Outer Space (1953)
 Ain't Misbehavin' (1955)
 Never Say Goodbye (1956)
 Around the World in 80 Days (1956) - Academy Award for Best Film Editing, shared with Gene Ruggiero
 The Big Fisherman (1959)

References

External links

1900 births
1960 deaths
American film editors
Best Film Editing Academy Award winners
Burials at Forest Lawn Memorial Park (Hollywood Hills)
People from Sturgis, Michigan